Alexandre aux Indes (Alexander in India) is an opera by the French composer Nicolas-Jean Lefroid de Méreaux, first performed at the Académie Royale de Musique (the Paris Opera) on 26 August 1783. It takes the form of a tragédie lyrique in three acts. The libretto, by Étienne Morel de Chédeville, concerns Alexander the Great and the Indian king Porus. The plot has similarities with Racine's tragedy Alexandre le Grand (1665) and Metastasio's libretto Alessandro nell'Indie.

Roles

Synopsis
King Porus is due to marry Axiane when he hears news that Alexander the Great is threatening his kingdom. Hephaestion arrives and offers Porus the choice of submission to Alexander or war. Porus chooses to resist. In the ensuing battle, Porus is abandoned by his men but bravely fights single-handedly against a band of enemies, until he is captured. He pretends to be a simple officer. Alexander, who admires his courage, lets him go free. Axiane now arrives and begs Alexander to show mercy. Alexander agrees but only if Porus submits. Porus, however, renews the fight. Alexander besieges him and just as Porus is about to be captured again, Axiane throws herself in the way of Alexander's soldiers. Alexander asks Porus how he wishes to be treated. He replies: as a king. Alexander allows Porus to keep his lands and Axiane. Porus is moved and offers Alexander his loyalty and friendship.

Notes

Sources
 Félix Clément and Pierre Larousse Dictionnaire des Opéras, p.21.
 Original libretto at BNF Gallica
 Original printed score at BNF Gallica

Operas
French-language operas
Tragédies en musique
1783 operas